Rasmei Kampuchea ("Brightness of Cambodia") is Cambodia's largest daily newspaper. The paper was started in 1993. It circulates about 18,000 copies in Khmer.

References

External links
 Official website

Khmer-language newspapers
Publications established in 1993
1993 establishments in Cambodia
Newspapers published in Cambodia